Eupithecia bivittata is a moth in the family Geometridae first described by George Duryea Hulst in 1896. It is found in coastal central California, United States.

The wingspan is about 19–20 mm. The forewings are brownish with practically no trace of maculation except for a small black discal dot and two variably distinct, whitish, subterminal lines. The hindwings are light ocherous with smoky shading along the inner margin.

References

Moths described in 1896
bivittata
Moths of North America